La Prairie Township is located in Marshall County, Illinois. As of the 2010 census, its population was 364 and it contained 158 housing units. La Prairie Township was originally named Fairfield Township, but changed its name in December, 1850.

Geography

Demographics

References

External links
City-data.com
Illinois State Archives

Townships in Marshall County, Illinois
Peoria metropolitan area, Illinois
Townships in Illinois
1849 establishments in Illinois